Haplochromis macropsoides is a species of cichlid endemic to Uganda where it is known to occur in Lake George and the Kazinga Channel and may also be found in Lake Edward.

This species can reach a length of  SL.

References

Fish described in 1973
macropsoides
Endemic freshwater fish of Uganda
Cichlid fish of Africa
Taxonomy articles created by Polbot